Secret is the third and final studio album by English new wave band Classix Nouveaux, released in 1983 by record label Liberty. It was the band's only album not to chart in the UK.

Reception 

Trouser Press wrote: "the impressive variety and sophistication makes Secret the band's best album".

Track listing

Personnel
Classix Nouveaux
Sal Solo
Mik Sweeney
Jimi Sumén
B.P. Hurding
with:
Adrian Lee, Andrew Prince, David Verhans, Gary Barnacle, Jack Waldman, Nick Campey, Pandit Dinesh, S. Paul Wilson
Anne Dudley - string arrangement on "Forever and a Day"
Technical
Fema Jiya, Phil Thornalley, Steve Churchyard, Steve Cooksey - engineer
Edward Bell - sleeve artwork

References

External links 

 

1983 albums
Classix Nouveaux albums
Albums produced by Alex Sadkin
Liberty Records albums